Pothyne is a genus of beetles in the family Cerambycidae, containing the following species:

 Pothyne acaciae Gardner, 1930
 Pothyne albolineata Matsushita, 1933
 Pothyne albosignata Breuning, 1950
 Pothyne albosternalis Breuning, 1982
 Pothyne andamanica Breuning, 1940
 Pothyne annulata Breuning, 1942
 Pothyne annulicornis Breuning, 1948
 Pothyne biguttula Schwarzer, 1929
 Pothyne birmanica Pic, 1930
 Pothyne borneotica Breuning, 1940
 Pothyne burmanensis Breuning, 1943
 Pothyne capito Pascoe, 1866
 Pothyne celebensis Breuning, 1940
 Pothyne celebiana Breuning, 1943
 Pothyne ceylonensis Breuning, 1940
 Pothyne chocolata Gressitt, 1939
 Pothyne combreti Gardner, 1930
 Pothyne convexifrons Gardner, 1930
 Pothyne discomaculata Breuning, 1940
 Pothyne distincta Breuning, 1950
 Pothyne elongata Breuning, 1940
 Pothyne elongatula Breuning, 1948
 Pothyne fasciata Gressitt, 1951
 Pothyne femoralis Breuning, 1940
 Pothyne flavostictica Breuning, 1940
 Pothyne formosana Schwarzer, 1925
 Pothyne fusiscapa Gressitt, 1940
 Pothyne griseolineata Breuning, 1940
 Pothyne griseomarmorata Breuning, 1970
 Pothyne harmandi Breuning, 1948
 Pothyne imasakai Hayashi, 1976
 Pothyne incerta Breuning, 1942
 Pothyne indica Breuning, 1940
 Pothyne indistincta Breuning, 1940
 Pothyne interrupta Pic, 1927
 Pothyne keyensis Breuning, 1948
 Pothyne kualabokensis Hayashi, 1976
 Pothyne laevifrons Breuning, 1943
 Pothyne laosensis (Pic, 1934)
 Pothyne laosica Breuning, 1968
 Pothyne laterialba Gressitt, 1937
 Pothyne lineolata Gressitt, 1940
 Pothyne longipennis Breuning & Itzinger, 1943
 Pothyne longiscapus Breuning, 1948
 Pothyne luteomaculata Breuning, 1982
 Pothyne luzonica Breuning, 1942
 Pothyne macrophthalma Breuning, 1940
 Pothyne malaccensis Breuning, 1942
 Pothyne mimodistincta Breuning, 1968
 Pothyne mindanaonis Breuning, 1942
 Pothyne mouhoti Breuning, 1982
 Pothyne multilineata (Pic, 1934)
 Pothyne multivittata Breuning, 1980
 Pothyne multivittipennis Breuning, 1950
 Pothyne multivittipennis Breuning, 1966
 Pothyne niasica Aurivillius, 1916
 Pothyne obliquetruncata Gressitt, 1939
 Pothyne ochracea Breuning, 1940
 Pothyne ochreolineata Breuning, 1943
 Pothyne ochreovittipennis Breuning, 1968  
 Pothyne paralaosensis Breuning, 1968
 Pothyne paraterialba Breuning, 1971
 Pothyne pauloplicata Pic, 1934
 Pothyne philippinica Breuning, 1940
 Pothyne pici Breuning, 1948
 Pothyne polyplicata Hua & She, 1987
 Pothyne postcutellaris Breuning, 1964
 Pothyne proxima Breuning, 1940
 Pothyne pseudolaosensis Breuning, 1977
 Pothyne pseudorufipes Breuning, 1948
 Pothyne rufovittata Breuning, 1943
 Pothyne rugifrons Gressitt, 1940
 Pothyne rugiscapa Breuning, 1940
 Pothyne septemlineata Aurivillius, 1923
 Pothyne septemvittipennis Breuning, 1962
 Pothyne seriata Gressitt, 1940
 Pothyne sericeomaculata Breuning, 1950
 Pothyne sikkimana Breuning, 1969
 Pothyne sikkimensis Breuning, 1940
 Pothyne silacea Pascoe, 1871
 Pothyne sinensis Pic, 1927
 Pothyne siporensis Breuning, 1943
 Pothyne stictica Breuning, 1950
 Pothyne strigata Gahan, 1907
 Pothyne strigatoides Breuning, 1950
 Pothyne subdistincta Breuning, 1950
 Pothyne subfemoralis Breuning, 1968
 Pothyne subvittata Breuning, 1950
 Pothyne subvittipennis Breuning & Ohbayashi, 1966
 Pothyne sumatrana Breuning, 1942
 Pothyne sumatrensis Breuning, 1982
 Pothyne suturalis Pic, 1924
 Pothyne suturella Breuning, 1942
 Pothyne tenuevittata (Fairmaire, 1888)
 Pothyne thibetana Breuning, 1950
 Pothyne trivittata Newman, 1842
 Pothyne uniformis Heller, 1924
 Pothyne variegata Thomson, 1864
 Pothyne variegatoides Breuning, 1968
 Pothyne virgata Gahan, 1907
 Pothyne vittata Aurivillius, 1916

References

 
Agapanthiini